Ayesha Javed (born 12 October 1967) is a Pakistani politician who was a Member of the Provincial Assembly of the Punjab, from 2008 to May 2018.

Early life and education
She was born on 12 October 1967 in Abbottabad.

She has earned Master of Arts in Political Science in 1996 from University of the Punjab.

Political career
She was elected to the Provincial Assembly of the Punjab as a candidate of Pakistan Muslim League (Q) on a reserved seat for women in 2008 Pakistani general election.

She joined Pakistan Muslim League (N) (PML-N) in March 2013.

She was re-elected to the Provincial Assembly of the Punjab as a candidate of PML-N on a reserved seat for women in 2013 Pakistani general election.

References

Living people
Punjab MPAs 2013–2018
Women members of the Provincial Assembly of the Punjab
1967 births
Pakistan Muslim League (N) politicians
Punjab MPAs 2008–2013
21st-century Pakistani women politicians